Nikos Kechagias may refer to:
 Nikos Kechagias (footballer, born 2000)
 Nikos Kechagias (footballer, born 1969)